Nicolai Ivanovich Andrusov (19 December 1861 – 27 April 1924) was a Russian Empire born geologist, stratigrapher, and palaeontologist.

He was born in Odessa, then a part of the Russia Empire. He studied geology and zoology at the Novorossia University in Odessa. He then traveled across the Russian Empire and central Europe to collect fossil specimens.

The Challenger expedition of 1872–1876 studied processes of the sea floor. In 1889 Andrusov published a review of this expedition in Gornyi zhurnal (Mining Journal). He would later perform studies of the geology and sediments of the Ponto-Caspian steppe.

In 1890-91 he participated in a deep water expedition to the Black Sea by the Russian Geographical Society. This expedition discovered hydrogen sulfide in the lower portions of this sea. Andrusov was the first to propose that this substance was created by biological decomposition of life forms (bacteria) containing sulfurous compounds.

He was married to Nadezhda Genrikhovna Schliemann in 1899, the daughter of archaeologist Heinrich Schliemann. In 1905 he became a professor at the University of Kyiv. In 1914 he became a member of the Russian Academy of Sciences. He emigrated to France in 1920 due to illness. In 1919 he learned about the death of his elder son, and suffered a stroke which resulted in paralysis of a leg and an arm. His relatives decided to move him to Paris, where he had an inheritance from his father-in-law. In 1922 he moved to Prague due to material difficulties, where he died in 1924.

His son Dimitrij Andrusov became a notable geologist and a member of the Slovak Academy of Sciences.

The wrinkle ridge Dorsa Andrusov on the Moon is named after him, as well as the Mid-Black Sea High - Andrusov Ridge.

References

Further reading

External links 
 
Bio, in Ukrainian

1861 births
1924 deaths
Geologists from the Russian Empire
Explorers from the Russian Empire
Scientists from Odesa
Andrusov, Nicolai
Full members of the Saint Petersburg Academy of Sciences
Full Members of the Russian Academy of Sciences (1917–1925)
Soviet emigrants to France
French emigrants to Czechoslovakia